Kolten is a given name. Notable people with the name include:

Kolten Solomon (born 1989), Canadian football player
Kolten Wong (born 1990), American baseball player

See also
Colten, given name
Kolton, given name and surname